Odette Lusien (11 November 1927 – 12 March 2007) was a French swimmer who competed in the 1952 Summer Olympics and in the 1956 Summer Olympics.

References

1927 births
2007 deaths
French female breaststroke swimmers
French female butterfly swimmers
Olympic swimmers of France
Swimmers at the 1952 Summer Olympics
Swimmers at the 1956 Summer Olympics
20th-century French women
21st-century French women